Samsudeen Kabeer (born 3 August 1970) is an Indian weightlifter. He competed in the men's lightweight event at the 1996 Summer Olympics.

References

1970 births
Living people
Indian male weightlifters
Olympic weightlifters of India
Weightlifters at the 1996 Summer Olympics
Place of birth missing (living people)